(born September 23, 1950) is a Japanese actor who has also used the stage name . He has appeared in tokusatsu kaiju productions (monster movies) and in pink films.

Life and career
Kusumi started appearing on Japanese TV as early as 1971 (under the name Mamoru Kusumi) when he played the role of Mirror Man in the Fuji TV superhero series of the same name which ran from December 1971 to November 1972. In 1973 he was the giant Zone Fighter in the Nippon Television series, again using the name Mamoru Kusumi. Again under the same name, he played the monsters Anguirus and King Caesar in the 1974 Toho film Godzilla vs. Mechagodzilla.

Still as Mamoru Kusumi, by November 1977 he also started acting in the Japanese softcore pornographic genre of pink film with a starring role in the Pro Taka studio movie  for director Seiji Izumi. Two years later, he starred in the pink film studio Shintōhō Eiga's 1979 film  directed by Kōji Seki. He appeared in several more movies as Mamoru Kusumi but in 1982 started acting as Kin'ichi Kasumi and according to the Japanese Movie Database, had made over 170 films by 2004.

The year 1985 saw Kusumi in two films for Shintōhō Eiga, directed Kōji Seki, and  directed by Akifumi Kageyama and with a screenplay by Kazuyoshi Sekine.

Kusumi continued making films for Shintōhō Eiga in the 1990s with  directed by Toshiya Ueno, one of the "Seven Lucky Gods of Pink". He also worked for the budget pink film studio Tokatsu in their May 1990 release . In this movie, directed and written by Kōsuke Fujiwara, Kusumi plays a hapless newspaper salesman who receives some supernatural help in furthering his career through sexual techniques. Kusumi was the subject of an interview in the August 1994 issue of PG, a "[s]pecialist Japanese magazine on pink films."

In May 2002, Kusumi appeared with veteran AV Idol Hitomi Kobayashi in a pink film distributed by Xces Film, . The film was directed by Tarō Araki and released by OP Eiga in April 2009.

Films
 Godzilla vs. Mechagodzilla (1974) as Anguirus, King Caesar
 The 6 Ultra Brothers vs. the Monster Army (1974)
 , Shintōhō Eiga (May 1979), dir:Kōji Seki
 , Million Film (February 1986), dir:Rumi Tama
 Latest Soap Technique (1990)
 , Xces Film (August 1991), dir:Sachi Hamano
 , Xces Film (November 1991), dir:Sachi Hamano
 , Xces Film (July 1992), dir:Sachi Hamano

Television
 Redman as Redman
 Mirrorman as Mirrorman
 Ike! Godman
 Zone Fighter as Zone Fighter
 Ultraman Ace as Zoffy, Alien Steal
 Ultraman Leo as Astra (uncredited)

References

External links 
 

Japanese male film actors
1950 births
Living people
People from Yokohama